Uwe Gensheimer (born 26 October 1986) is a German handball player for Rhein-Neckar Löwen. 

He made his international debut on 25 November 2005 against Slovenia. In 2021 he announced the end of his time in the national team, where he was the captain from 2014.

Team awards

Club
EHF Cup:
 2012–13
German Championship:
 2015–16
French Championship:
 2016–17, 2017–18, 2018–19
Coupe de France:
 2017-18
Coupe de la Ligue:
 2016-17, 2017-18, 2018-19

International
Summer Olympics:
: 2016
Junior European Championship:
: 2006
Junior World Championship:
: 2007

Awards
 Handball player of the year in Germany: 2011, 2012, 2013, 2014
 EHF Champions League Top Scorer: 2011, 2017, 2018
 MVP of the Junior World Championship: 2007
 All-Star left wing of the Junior European Championship: 2006
 Youth European Championship Top Scorer: 2004
 Bundesliga Player of the Season: 2010–11

References

External links

1986 births
Living people
Sportspeople from Mannheim
German male handball players
Rhein-Neckar Löwen players
Olympic handball players of Germany
Handball players at the 2016 Summer Olympics
Medalists at the 2016 Summer Olympics
Olympic bronze medalists for Germany
Olympic medalists in handball
Expatriate handball players
German expatriate sportspeople in France
Handball-Bundesliga players
Handball players at the 2020 Summer Olympics